The Laws of Maryland comprise the session laws have been enacted by the Maryland General Assembly each year.  According to the Boston College Law library, session laws are "useful in determining which laws were in force at a particular time."  Unlike the Annotated Code of Maryland, the Laws of Maryland are arranged chronologically, rather than by subject.  They are the state-level counterpart to the United States Statutes at Large.

See also 
 statutes
 session laws
 state law
 Annotated Code of Maryland
 Maryland General Assembly

Sources 
 
 
 
 

Maryland law